The Military ranks of Burundi are the military insignia used by the National Defence Force of Burundi.

Commissioned officer ranks
The rank insignia of commissioned officers.

Other ranks
The rank insignia of non-commissioned officers and enlisted personnel.

References

External links
 

Burundi
Military of Burundi